General elections were held in Dominica on 24 March 1975. The result was a victory for the Dominica Labour Party, which won 16 of the 21 seats. Voter turnout was 79.0%.

Results

References

Dominica
Elections in Dominica
1975 in Dominica
Dominica
March 1975 events in North America